Johann Wilhelm Haacke (23 August 1855 – 6 December 1912) was a German zoologist born in Clenze, Lower Saxony, who served as Director of the South Australian Museum in Adelaide from 1882 to 1884.

Career
He studied zoology at the University of Jena, earning his doctorate in 1878. Afterwards he worked as an assistant of Ernst Haeckel in Jena and at the University of Kiel. In 1881 he emigrated to New Zealand, working at the museums in Dunedin, under Professor Parker, and  Christchurch under Professor von Haast.

The following year he moved to Australia, where he replaced F. G. Waterhouse as Director of the South Australian Museum in Adelaide, and was a founding member of the Field Naturalists Society of South Australia. In August 1884 he laid to rest an old mystery about echidnas, proving they are oviparous not viviparous, with a specimen sent to the museum by a naturalist on Kangaroo Island. His work and the liberality with which he was treated attracted some criticism, as did his bombastic self-promotion. He resigned his position in October 1884, after a series of disputes with the museum's management but did not leave the colony.

He served as zoologist with the 1885 Geographical Society of Australasia's expedition to the Fly River, Papua New Guinea. In June 1886 he announced his imminent departure for Europe, and was invited by a large deputation of German settlers to represent them at an Allgemeiner Deutscher Kongress to be held in Berlin that September but declined, and left South Australia around July 1886 without fanfare.

From 1888 to 1893 he was director of the zoo in Frankfurt-am-Main, and afterwards was a lecturer at Darmstadt University of Technology (until 1897). Later, he worked as a private scholar and grammar school teacher. He died in Lüneburg on December 6, 1912.

Haacke is remembered for research of oviparity in monotremes, and studies involving the morphology of jellyfish and corals. In 1893 he coined the evolutionary term "orthogenesis". He also conducted investigations in the field of animal husbandry.

Evolutionary views

Haacke studied under Ernst Haeckel. He later turned against Haeckel for holding Darwinist views. He was also a critic of August Weismann. He experimented with mice and proposed a system of heredity similar to Gregor Mendel but differed in results. Haacke was a neo-Lamarckian and proponent of the inheritance of acquired characters.

Haacke believed that cells consist of individuals called gemmaria that operate as hereditary units. These consist of even smaller units known as gemmae. He believed these units to explain neo-Lamarckian inheritance. He was a proponent of orthogenesis. He held that from his theory of epimorphism evolution is a directed process tending towards perfection.

Selected writings 
He made contributions to Brehms Tierleben, a popular zoological compendium published in several editions, and with illustrator Wilhelm Kuhnert published Das Tierleben der Erde. Other noteworthy written efforts include: 
 Die Schöpfung der Tierwelt (1893)
 Gestaltung und Vererbung. Eine Entwickelungsmechanik der Organismen (1893)
 Die Schöpfung of Menschen und seiner Ideal. Ein Versuch zur Versöhnung zwischen Religion und Wissenschaft (1895)
 Aus der Schöpfungswerkstatt (1897)
 Grundriss der Entwickelungsmechanik (1897)

Taxon named in his honor 
The Wavy grubfish Parapercis haackei is named in his honor.

References

Further reading 
 "This article includes text based on a translation of an equivalent article at the French Wikipedia", listed as Allen G. Debus (ed.) (1968). World Who's Who in Science. . A Biographical Dictionary of Notable Scientists from Antiquity to the Present, Marquis Who's Who (Chicago): xvi + 1855 p.
 The Contemporary Review, Essay on Monotremes
Daum, Andreas. Wissenschaftspopularisierung im 19. Jahrhundert: Bürgerliche Kultur, naturwissenschaftliche Bildung und die deutsche Öffentlichkeit, 1848–1914. Munich: Oldenbourg, 1998, .

1855 births
1912 deaths
20th-century German zoologists
Lamarckism
Orthogenesis
People from Lüchow-Dannenberg
Academic staff of Technische Universität Darmstadt
19th-century German zoologists